Ophichthus microstictus is an eel in the family Ophichthidae (worm/snake eels). It was described by John E. McCosker in 2010. It is a marine, deep water-dwelling eel which is known from the western central Pacific Ocean, including Tonga, Fiji, and New Caledonia.

The species epithet "microstictus" means "small punctures" in Greek, and is treated as a noun in apposition. It refers to the small pores on the eel's head.

References

microstictus
Taxa named by John E. McCosker
Fish described in 2010